Evergestis desertalis is a species of moth in the family Crambidae described by Jacob Hübner in 1813. It is found in Spain, Romania, Bulgaria, Ukraine (Crimea), south-eastern Russia, on Sicily, Malta and Crete, Arabia and North Africa, including Algeria and Tunisia.

The wingspan is about 27 mm. There are two or more generations per year with adults on wing from May to October.

References

Moths described in 1813
Evergestis
Moths of Europe
Moths of Asia
Moths of Africa